Microscopic Milton is a British series of short animated films. Created and written by Tony Garth, they were first broadcast on CBBC between 1997 and 1999. The show was produced by Splash Animation Ltd and executive produced by Russell Neale Anthony Dever with distribution through EVA Entertainment. The series was self-financed and was one of the first commercially produced series on Cambridge Animo. The series was sold via acquisition to the BBC in the UK and Disney Channel in the USA. Two series were produced each of 13 X 5' being 26 eps in total.

Microscopic Milton was a tiny man who lived in a clock on the mantelpiece in a house owned by Mrs. Witherspoon (who is only seen from the shoulders down), who was unaware of Milton's existence. Milton was befriended by Mrs. Witherspoon's large, shaggy dog, Douglas.

Each episode ran five minutes, and 26 episodes were produced. The narrative was provided by sitcom star Brian Wilde though airings in America were narrated by Kristen Johnston.

Episode list
 Milton and the Shopping Trip
 Milton and the Bubble Bath
 Milton and the Camping Holiday
 Milton and the Dust Collection
 Milton and the Fitness Plan
 Milton and the Toybox
 Milton and the Beanstalk
 Milton and the Kitten
 Milton and the Broken Clock
 Milton and the Leprechaun
 Milton and Mrs. Witherspoon's Wish
 Milton and the Parrot
 Milton and the Snowdog
 Milton and the Space Alien
 Milton and the Time Machine
 Milton and the Visitor
 Milton and the Big Freeze
 Milton and the Birthday Party
 Milton and the Bumblebee
 Milton and the Circus
 Milton and the Disappearing Dog
 Milton and the Dog Show
 Milton and the Dog That Ate New York
 Milton and the Halloween Party

References

External links
 

BBC children's television shows
British children's animated television shows
1990s British children's television series
1997 British television series debuts
1999 British television series endings
English-language television shows